Terry McCarthy may refer to:
Terry McCarthy (journalist)
Terry McCarthy (politician), (born 1940), politician from the Australian Northern Territory
Terry McCarthy (racing driver), racing driver from the United States